Transcription factor 12 is a protein that in humans is encoded by the TCF12 gene.

The protein encoded by this gene is a member of the basic helix-loop-helix (bHLH) E-protein family that recognizes the consensus binding site (E-box) CANNTG. This encoded protein is expressed in many tissues, among them skeletal muscle, thymus, B- and T-cells, and may participate in regulating lineage-specific gene expression through the formation of heterodimers with other bHLH E-proteins. Several alternatively spliced transcript variants of this gene have been described, but the full-length nature of some of these variants has not been determined. TCF12 has been speculatively related to human male sexuality through a GWAS study indicating association to a related single nucleotide polymorphism. Mutations in this gene have also been associated with cases of coronal craniosynostosis.

TCF12 is the primary heterodimerising partner of TCF21, a tumour suppressor gene and a target of SRY/SOX9 activity.

References

Further reading

External links